John Francis Gilbert (20 November 1918 – 29 November 1998) was an Australian premiership winning rugby league footballer who played in the 1940s.

Background
Jack and his brothers: Herb Gilbert, Jr. and Bob Gilbert were sons of the pioneer rugby league champion footballer, Herb Gilbert. The brothers grew up in Bexley, New South Wales and came through the St George junior ranks.

Playing career
Gilbert's career was curtailed by World War II and he only played two full first grade seasons with St. George in 1941 and 1946. Gilbert won a premiership with St. George, playing centre in the team that defeated Eastern Suburbs in the 1941 Grand Final. At season's end Gilbert was posted to New Guinea to see active service with the Australian Army.

He survived the war, and after his discharge in April 1946, Gilbert resumed his playing career at St. George for the 1946 season, before retiring from Sydney first grade football. His grandson, Sam Gilbert is an AFL footballer for the St Kilda club.

Death
Gilbert died on 29 November 1998, and was cremated at Woronora Cemetery, Sutherland, New South Wales.

Published sources
 Whiticker, Alan & Hudson, Glen (2006) The Encyclopedia of Rugby League Players, Gavin Allen Publishing, Sydney
 Haddan, Steve (2007) The Finals - 100 Years of National Rugby League Finals, Steve Haddan Publishing, Brisbane

References

1918 births
1998 deaths
Australian rugby league players
St. George Dragons players
Australian Army personnel of World War II
Rugby league centres
Rugby league players from Sydney
Country New South Wales rugby league team players
Australian Army soldiers